The fourth season of the television sitcom Brooklyn Nine-Nine premiered September 20, 2016 on Fox and ended May 23, 2017 with 22 episodes.

Summary
Jake and Holt are placed in Florida as part of the witness protection program until the Nine-Nine helps them take down Figgis. The squad is subsequently punished by being placed on the night shift, but are put back on the day shift when Captain Jason "C.J." Stentley is transferred from active duty for his incompetence. Charles and Genevieve adopt a son, Nikolaj. Adrian returns and resumes his romance with Rosa, but they call off their wedding and decide to take their time getting to know each other. Jake and Amy move in together after having a bet to see which of them can keep their apartment for catching the most escaped criminals. Gina gets hit by a bus and becomes pregnant with the child of a Boyle cousin, Milton. She also saves the precinct from getting shut down. Terry becomes a victim of racial profiling. Jake and Rosa compete for a spot on their idol Lt. Hawkins' task force, but Hawkins turns out to be a dirty cop and she frames them for bank robbery. They are found guilty and are each sentenced to 15 years in jail.

Cast

Main
 Andy Samberg as Jake Peralta
 Stephanie Beatriz as Rosa Diaz
 Terry Crews as Terry Jeffords
 Melissa Fumero as Amy Santiago
 Joe Lo Truglio as Charles Boyle
 Chelsea Peretti as Gina Linetti
 Andre Braugher as Raymond Holt

Starring
 Dirk Blocker as Michael Hitchcock
 Joel McKinnon Miller as Norm Scully

Recurring
 Ken Marino as Captain Jason "C.J." Stentley
 Jason Mantzoukas as Adrian Pimento
 Gina Gershon as Lt. Melanie Hawkins
 Marc Evan Jackson as Kevin Cozner
 Christopher Gehrman as Sam Boyle

Guest
 Maya Rudolph as U.S. Marshall Karen Haas
 Rhea Perlman as Estelle
 Jorma Taccone as Taylor
 Esther Povitsky as Emily
 Jim O'Heir as Sheriff Reynolds
 Eric Roberts as Jimmy Figgis
 Zooey Deschanel as Jessica Day
 Jimmy Smits as Victor Santiago
 Mary Lynn Rajskub as Genevieve Mirren-Carter
 Marshawn Lynch as himself
 Craig Robinson as Doug Judy 
 Charles Baker as George Judy
 Nathan Fillion as Mark Deveraux
 Greg Germann as Gary Lurmax
 L. Scott Caldwell as Laverne Holt
 Ryan Phillippe as Milton Boyle
 Brent Briscoe as Matthew Langdon
 Desmond Harrington as Officer Maldack
 Andy Daly as Jeffrey Bouché

Episodes

Reception

Ratings

Critical response
The fourth season received critical acclaim, with many lauding the Florida story arc and the tactful treatment of systematic racism. The review aggregator website Rotten Tomatoes reports a 100% approval rating, with an average score of 8.09/10, based on 13 reviews. The website's consensus reads, "Riotous shenanigans still reign supreme, but Brooklyn Nine-Nines fourth season also broaches controversial issues with its trademark compassion and eloquent humor."

Awards and nominations

 Live +7 ratings were not available, so Live +3 ratings have been used instead.

References

External links
  at Fox
 

 
2016 American television seasons
2017 American television seasons
Brooklyn Nine-Nine